is a Japanese professional shogi player ranked 8-dan.

Early life
Naganuma was born on February 8, 1965, in Gifu Prefecture. He entered the Japan Shogi Association's apprentice school at the rank of 5-kyū in 1979 under the guidance of shogi professional . He was promoted to the rank or 1-dan in 1981, and obtained full professional status and the rank of 4-dan in July 1986.

Playing style
Naganuma is known for a utilitarian playing style which prioritorizes material advantages over positional ones. For this reason, he has been nicknamed the  where komatori refers to "shogi piece capturing" and bōzu refers to a "Buddhist monk".

Promotion history
Naganuma's promotion history is as follows:
 5-kyū: 1979
 1-dan: 1981
 4-dan: July 21, 1986
 5-dan: July 31, 1991
 6-dan: November 7, 1997
 7-dan: January 26, 2006
 8-dan: August 31, 2020

Awards and honors
In 2011, Naganuma received the Japan Shogi Association's "25 Years Service Award" in recognition of being an active professional for twenty-five years.

References

External links
ShogiHub: Professional Player Info · Naganuma, Hiroshi

Japanese shogi players
Living people
Professional shogi players
Professional shogi players from Gifu Prefecture
1965 births